The second season of Jem aired between September 21, 1987 and January 12, 1988 as first-run syndication in the United States.

Episodes

References

External links
 

1987 American television seasons
1988 American television seasons